Undergrads (stylized as underGRADS) is an adult animated sitcom centered on the lives of four college undergraduate freshmen. Originally broadcast on MTV in 2001, only 13 episodes were created. It has since been shown on Teletoon in Canada, and Trouble in the United Kingdom. The show was conceived by Pete Williams, who dropped out of college at the age of 19 to work on the show in 1997. Williams performs most of the voices on the show. The series was produced by David McGrath.

Overview

The show depicts a typical first-year college experience. Characters in the show represent stereotypical college types; including the everyman (Nitz), the "frat boy" (Rocko), the "ladies' man" (Cal), the nerd (Gimpy), the punk girl (Jessie), and the "ditz" (Kimmy). Typical situations depicted in the show include student loans, bad cafeteria food, questioning of identity, fraternity rivalries, odd traditions, unpleasant RAs, money problems, peer pressure, and the "freshman fifteen". Few episodes depict the characters in class; the one exception is Rocko's ROTC class in the episode, Financial Aid.

The location in the show has never been named. It appears to be a typical North American college town. However, it has been hinted in several episodes that the show takes place in New England, and Pete Williams, the show's creator, attended a university in this region. Episode 2, Traditions, features the "Xposed Xpo," a naked run, and a classic tradition of the University of Vermont. In episode 12, Risk, there is a free Ben & Jerry's day, as well as a Spring Fling, another UVM tradition. In the episode Drunks, both Jessie and Nitz hold fake New York state driver's licenses. The episode Identity Crisis takes place at the start of the second semester and reveals bare trees and snow, conditions more likely to be found in northern states in January. However, in episode 1 Gimpy disguises Mump as a California Highway Patrol Officer to follow Rocko.

Characters

Main
 Parker "Nitz" Walsh (Voiced by Pete Williams) is the protagonist. He is shy and attends State U, a generic university. He often finds himself torn between hanging out with his old high school friends, the new friends he's made at college, and pining after his high school crush, Kimmy Burton. Nitz is based on series creator, Pete Williams.
 Rocko (Voiced by Pete Williams) is a boorish, alcoholic fratboy. He attends the local community college Central State Junior Community College and is a member of the Alpha Alpha fraternity, although he is viewed with contempt by his frat brothers. His only interests are alcohol and women, although most women do not reciprocate his clumsy advances. He openly despises Cal.
 Calvin "Cal" Evans (Voiced by Pete Williams) is Nitz's roommate. Although he is not too bright, his good looks make him very popular with women. He speaks in a high-pitched voice and frequently drools, and often ends his sentences with the word "guy."
 Justin "Gimpy" Taylor (Voiced by Pete Williams) is a nerd. He attends the tech institute Tekerson Tech and almost never leaves his room, primarily communicating with his friends via video conference. Gimpy uses the online alias "G Prime" and commands a group of fellow geeks to act as his minions. He is an extreme Star Wars fan.

Supporting
 Jessie (Voiced by Jene Yeo) a friend of Nitz, also goes to State U. Jessie has a very laid back, punk-girl-type personality on campus. She often accompanies Nitz on his misadventures and often provides a level-headed and mature point of view. Although Nitz openly pines for Kimmy Burton throughout the show's run, Jessie develops a crush on Nitz to which he is oblivious. Jessie's frustration with Nitz eventually results in outright spite for Kimmy. The character is voiced by Jene Yeo, upon whom the character is based.
 Kimmy Burton (Voiced by Susan Quinn) is a redheaded girl Nitz has had a crush on since high school. Kimmy attends State U and tries to be involved with all of the on-campus activities. Spacey and self-centered, she is completely oblivious to Nitz's affections. Kimmy is romantically interested in Mark, another drama student at the college, but does not realize he is gay.
 Mump (Voiced by Robert Tinkler) attends Tekerson Tech and is Gimpy's lead minion and sidekick. He is a short and overweight. Mump is fiercely protective of his friendship with Gimpy and often agrees with him regardless of whether he should or not. Mump is a member of ROTC.

Recurring
 Doug (The Duggler) (Voiced by Pete Williams) is the resident assistant at the State U dorms where Nitz and Cal reside. He is depicted as a social relic from the 1960s, sporting an overall hippie-like motif. He always wears a bathrobe, which he tells Cal is an unofficial uniform for State U RAs. He is something of a social inept, with a forced way of speaking, refers to himself in the third person, and often denies himself opportunities to partake in unofficial student events and fun. Other students appear indifferent to him.
 Craig (Voiced by James Kee) is the leader of Rocko's fraternity. He along most of the other fraternity brothers dislikes Rocko but often takes pity on him.
 Charity (Voiced by Katie Griffin) is Jessie's air-head roommate. She is obsessed with her ex-boyfriend Jonah, who left her prior to the series' beginning. She briefly dates Rocko when he tries to use her to make his ex-girlfriend jealous.
 SHE PRIME (Voiced by Sunday Muse) is a female hacker at Tekerson Tech. According to the episode guide on the series' official website, her name is Tabitha. After hacking Gimpy, the two of them begin a brief online relationship that ends badly due to Gimpy's self-sabotage. Although they never meet in person, SHE-Prime and Gimpy's dorm rooms are immediately next to one another. If the show were to have continued, she would have had a love/hate relationship with Gimpy.
 Spud (Voiced by Peter Oldring) is a diehard Trekkie and Gimpy's rival. He was the original leader of Tekerson Tech's students, but was supplanted once Gimpy moved into the Tekerson residence.
 Mark, (Voiced by Richie Favalaro) the drama guy. He attends State U and is found often by Kimmy's side. Both Kimmy and Nitz are oblivious to the fact Mark is gay (which he makes little attempt to hide).
 Lance, Mark's boyfriend who also attends State U. He is more often than not mentioned by Mark than seen on screen, though he is seen briefly carrying a couch in Roommates and singing showtunes at the end of Screw Week.
 Rob Brodie (Voiced by Josh A. Cagan) is one of Jessie's friends. He is a film student who is frequently caught over-hyping whatever he's involved with. He often introduces himself when entering a room, even to people he knows.
 Kruger (Voiced by Yannick Bisson) is another of Jessie's friends. Kruger is a foul-mouthed smoker and a pessimist who often disagrees with everyone.
 Dan (Voiced by Pete Williams) is a friend of Jessie's who has no speaking lines in the entire series - all he does is laugh.
 Gimpy's Minions are a troupe of nerds and geeks led by Gimpy at Tekerson Tech, much like a private army. Mump is a nominal second-in-command to Gimpy. Aside from Gimpy and Mump themselves, none of this group are identified by name.
 Rita (Voiced by Jenny Kim) is the tyrannical Resident Assistant of Gimpy's dorm at Tekerson Tech. She wears glasses, has her hair in a bun and wears an 'RA' armband. Her slippers are shaped like sharks. She dislikes Gimpy and frequently tries to foil his plans. She has a brief fling with Cal when Gimpy uses him to distract her.
 Stoner Dave  (Voiced by Yannick Bisson) is a stereotypical "stoner", recognizable by his black shirt, slouch and large nose.
 Studious Dave (Voiced by Garnet Harding) is a bespectacled African-American student at State U who is obsessed with finding things that will look good on his application to Wharton.

Episodes

Music
The theme song, "The Click", is written and performed by the band Good Charlotte, who appear in the episode Risk. Much of the music featured in Undergrads include songs from various indie rock bands and Canadian artists, such as Vibrolux, Alkaline Trio, Knacker, Sam Roberts, Reggie and the Full Effect, Sloan, The Planet Smashers, The Brodys, and The Rosenbergs, among others. The score of the show was composed and produced by Jono Grant. A list of bands and songs used in each episode can be found at the show's official website. 

This style of music was also heavily featured in another Decode Entertainment series, Radio Free Roscoe, which had the same music directors as Undergrads.

The American broadcast used different songs by artists such as Linkin Park, Madonna, Kid Rock, Lenny Kravitz, and the Foo Fighters.

References

External links

 
 
 'Undergrads' Bombed in the US. 20 Years Later, It's Making a Comeback, Thanks to Canada. Vice

2000s American adult animated television series
2000s American college television series
2000s American teen sitcoms
2001 American television series debuts
2001 American television series endings
2000s Canadian adult animated television series
2000s Canadian teen sitcoms
2001 Canadian television series debuts
2001 Canadian television series endings
American adult animated comedy television series
American animated sitcoms
American flash adult animated television series
Canadian adult animated comedy television series
Canadian animated sitcoms
Canadian flash animated television series
English-language television shows
Good Charlotte
MTV cartoons
Teletoon original programming
Television series by DHX Media
Teen animated television series